Daniel Ganderton (born 24 October 1988 in Launceston, Tasmania) is a Thoroughbred horse racing jockey.

Ganderton comes from a racing family, originally racing for his uncle's stable in Spreyton, Tasmania. Ganderton started racing in 2005 and forged his name as the leading apprentice in Tasmania. In February 2008 he was acquired by Gai Waterhouse stables as an apprentice and won the Sydney's leading apprentice standings for 2008/2009.

In his many victories to date Ganderton has claimed the Queensland cup riding aboard Cape Breton.

Personal life 
Ganderton attended Hagley Farm Primary School in Tasmania, and high school at St Patrick's College, Launceston. In his spare time he enjoys playing football where he played at Launceston City, and represented Northern Tasmania squads in football before becoming a professional jockey.

References

Australian jockeys
Launceston City FC players
Sportspeople from Launceston, Tasmania
1988 births
Living people
Association footballers not categorized by position
Australian soccer players